European route E 803 is a European B class road in Spain, connecting the cities Salamanca – Cáceres – Mérida – Seville.

Route 
 
: Salamanca - Mérida - Sevilla
: Sevilla

External links 
 UN Economic Commission for Europe: Overall Map of E-road Network (2007)
 International E-road network

International E-road network
Roads in Spain